Michael Foley may refer to:

Michael Foley (academic) (born 1948), international relations scholar
Michael Foley (American football) (born 1955), American football coach at Colgate University
Michael Foley (cricketer) (1844–1904), New Zealand cricketer
Michael Foley (cyclist) (born 1999), Canadian cyclist
Mick Foley (footballer) (1892–?), Irish footballer
Michael Foley (Kildare footballer), Irish Gaelic footballer
Michael Foley (Leitrim footballer), Irish Gaelic footballer
Michael Foley (Ohio politician) (born 1963), Ohio (U.S.) politician
Mick Foley (public servant) (1923–1975), Australian public servant
Michael Foley (rugby union) (born 1967), Australian rugby player
Michael Hamilton Foley (1820–1870), Canadian politician
Michael W. Foley (born 1964), American electrical engineer
Mick Foley (born 1965), American professional wrestler
Mike Foley (Australian politician) (born 1946), Tasmanian politician
Mike Foley (Nebraska politician) (born 1954), Nebraska (U.S.) politician